Two warships of Sweden have been named Springaren, after Springaren:

 , a Delfinen-class submarine launched in 1935 and stricken in 1956.
 , a  launched in 1961 and stricken in 1987.

Swedish Navy ship names